The RWD 8 was a Polish parasol wing monoplane trainer aircraft produced by RWD. It was used from 1934 to 1939 by the Polish Air Force and civilian aviation.

Development
The RWD 8 was designed in response to a Polish Air Force requirement in 1931 for a basic trainer aircraft. It was designed by the RWD team of Stanisław Rogalski, Stanisław Wigura and Jerzy Drzewiecki. The first prototype (registration SP-AKL), was flown in early 1933. It won the contest for the new Polish military trainer, against the PZL-5bis and Bartel BM-4h biplanes. It was considered a very stable and well-handling aircraft.

Since the DWL (Doświadczalne Warsztaty Lotnicze) workshops – a manufacturer of RWD designs – had limited production capability, the Polish military decided to produce the aircraft in a nationalized factory PWS (Podlaska Wytwórnia Samolotów). DWL gave away the licence free of charge, only for covering design costs. PWS produced aircraft for both military and civilian aviation, while DWL produced aircraft for civilian use only. The first PWS-built RWD 8 was flown in September 1934. These aircraft, designated RWD 8 PWS (or RWD 8 pws), differed from the original RWD 8 DWL (or RWD 8 dwl) in minor details, mainly having thinner landing gear shock absorbers and being slightly heavier and therefore slower.

Apart from the standard variant, 50 RWD 8a PWS were built with an additional 95 L (25 U.S. gal) fuel tank in thicker central wing section, giving increased range. A small series was built with a rear cab covered with blinds, for blind flying training. A frame with a hook for glider towing could be attached to the aircraft. A further development of the RWD 8 was the aerobatics and training aircraft, the RWD-17.

In total, over 550 RWD 8s were built (about 80 by DWL and about 470 by PWS). Production ceased in early 1939. The RWD 8 was the most numerous aircraft manufactured in Poland up to that time. Small series of license-built produced 1935 by Rogožarski Belgrade (three aircraft).

Technical description
The RW-8 was conventional in layout, and had mixed construction (steel and wood frame with canvas and plywood covering). The crew of two, sitting in tandem, were in an open cockpit, with individual windshields. Twin controls were fitted. Power came from a 4-cylinder air-cooled 90 kW (120 hp) straight engine PZInż, Junior (licence built Walter Junior) (82 kW /110 hp nominal power). 120 hp Walter Major or de Havilland Gipsy Major. A two-blade wooden propeller was fitted. The aircraft had a conventional landing gear, with a rear skid. The fuel tank in fuselage had 75 L (18 U.S. gal) (RWD 8 PWS) or 85 L (21 U.S. gal) (RWD 8 DWL). The wings folded rearwards.

Operational history

RWD 8s were used in the Polish military trainer aviation from 1934, becoming a standard type of primary trainer. In November 1938, there were 349 RWD 8s in the Air Force. RWD 8s were also used in Polish civilian aviation – particularly in regional aeroclubs. More than 80 aircraft were bought for public collection funds, in order to train aviators. They were also used in the Polish aviation sport.

A small number were exported: three were sold to Palestine, one to Spain, Morocco and Brazil. Licences for building the RWD 8 was sold to Estonia (one aircraft was produced, with markings ES-RWD) and Rogozarski of Yugoslavia (a small series with radial engines was built). At least one RWD 8 was sold to Spain via Portugal during the Spanish Civil War. It was used as a reconnaissance aircraft and a trainer for the Nationalist forces.

In the invasion of Poland 1939, the RWD 8s were used in 13 liaison flights, three aircraft in each, assigned to Armies. Many other aircraft were mobilized during the campaign and used in improvised liaison units. An advantage of the RWD 8 was its capability for short take off and landing on unprepared fields, but the missions of their crews were dangerous. RWD 8s of the Polesie Operational Group were the last Polish aircraft in the sky during the campaign. They were flying reconnaissance missions during the Battle of Kock, and even threw hand grenades.

A great number of RWD 8s were bombed by the Germans in air bases (unlike Polish combat aircraft) or burned by withdrawing Poles. A total of 57 aircraft were withdrawn to Romania, about 40 to Latvia and 2 to Hungary. Only some dozen aircraft were captured by the Germans in airworthy condition. In Romania and Hungary they were used until the late 1940s. None returned to Poland after the war, and today, none have survived.

Variants
RWD 8
Prototypes and initial production aircraft
RWD 8 PWS
Aircraft built by PWS (Podlaska Wytwórnia Samolotów)
RWD 8 DWL
Aircraft built by Doświadczalne Warsztaty Lotnicze (DWL)

Operators

Civil operators
: one aircraft
: one license-built
: one aircraft

: one aircraft

 Aero Club Belgrade three aircraft.

Military operators

Luftwaffe (small numbers)
 Hungarian Air Force
 Sherut Avir
 Latvian Air Force operated some 20 aircraft, that escaped from Poland
 Polish Air Force
 Royal Romanian Air Force
 Nationalist forces acquired 1 aircraft of the SEPEWE syndicate and received via Portugal. Used it for training duties.

Yugoslav Royal Air Force

Specifications (RWD 8 )

See also

References

Bibliography
 Gerdessen, Frederik. "Estonian Air Power 1918 – 1945". Air Enthusiast, No. 18, April – July 1982. pp. 61–76. .

External links

Photos and drawings of RWD-13
Civil Aircraft Register – Yugoslavija

1930s Polish civil trainer aircraft
1930s Polish military trainer aircraft
RWD-08
Parasol-wing aircraft
Single-engined tractor aircraft
Aircraft first flown in 1933
Aircraft manufactured in Estonia